The West Indies cricket team toured Bangladesh in October 1999 and played a single first-class against the Bangladesh national team. This was the year before Bangladesh was elevated to Test status as a full member of the International Cricket Conference (the ICC). The match was drawn. In addition, the teams played a two-match series of Limited Overs Internationals (LOI) which West Indies won 2–0. West Indies were captained by Brian Lara and Bangladesh by Aminul Islam.

ODI series

West Indies won the Biman Millennium Cup 2-0.

1st ODI

2nd ODI

References

1999 in West Indian cricket
1999 in Bangladeshi cricket
1999-2000
International cricket competitions from 1997–98 to 2000
Bangladeshi cricket seasons from 1971–72 to 2000